Anatoly Alekseyevich Beloglazov (born 16 September 1956) is a retired Russian freestyle wrestler. He won gold medals at the 1980 Olympics and 1977, 1978 and 1982 World Championships, placing third in 1983. In 2010 he was inducted into the FILA Hall of Fame.

Beloglazov was born in Kaliningrad, but later moved to the south and graduated from an institute of pedagogy in Krasnodar. He spent most of his life alongside his twin brother Sergei, who also became Olympic champion in freestyle wrestling.

Beloglazov took up wrestling in 1968 and debuted internationally at the 1974 European Junior Championships, where he won a gold medal; next year he won the 1975 World Junior Championships, and in 1976 started competing among seniors, winning the European title that year. Domestically he won four Soviet titles: in 1977, 1979–80 and 1982. He retired from competitions after the 1984 season, missing the 1984 Olympics due to their boycott by the Soviet Union, and then had a long career as a wrestling coach. He headed the Canadian (1990–96), Australian (1996–98), and then Russian and Belarusian national freestyle teams. Since 1998, an annual freestyle wrestling tournament honoring Beloglazov brothers has been held in Kaliningrad.

References

1956 births
Living people
Sportspeople from Kaliningrad
Olympic wrestlers of the Soviet Union
Wrestlers at the 1980 Summer Olympics
Soviet male sport wrestlers
Olympic gold medalists for the Soviet Union
Olympic medalists in wrestling
World Wrestling Championships medalists
Medalists at the 1980 Summer Olympics
Universiade medalists in wrestling
Universiade gold medalists for the Soviet Union
Medalists at the 1981 Summer Universiade
World Wrestling Champions